Tom Mendoza (born November 21, 1950) is an American business executive and public speaker. He is the former President and Vice Chairman of NetApp.

Career
Mendoza joined NetApp in 1994 as Vice President of North America sales. He served as its President from 2000 until 2008, when he became Vice Chairman.

Mendoza helped establish the culture that allowed NetApp to be ranked #1 in Fortune Magazine’s "100 Best Companies To Work For" in 2009. as well as being a co-recipient with NetApp CEO, Dan Warmenhovenof, of the Morgan Stanley Leadership Award for Global Commerce —the first time the award had been co-presented to two individuals.

Mendoza retired from NetApp in 2019 and currently serves on the Boards of VAST Data, UiPath, Varonis, ServiceSource, and Arxan. He previously served on the Boards of Infoblox, NetScreen (acquired by Juniper Networks), and Rhapsody Networks (acquired by Brocade). Mr. Mendoza also serves on the Justin Tuck RUSH Foundation for Children's Literacy.

Mendoza frequently speaks on corporate culture and leadership to a wide variety of audiences which have included major Universities such as Stanford University (where he has been a guest lecturer since 1997), Notre Dame, Harvard and United States Military Academy as well as to diverse groups such as the  United States Marine Corps, keynotes at Oracle World and numerous other industry events.
 
Charities that Mr. Mendoza has been significantly involved with include the Pat Tillman Foundation, St. Baldrick’s Foundation, the Navy SEAL Foundation and Justin Tuck’s RUSH Foundation for Children’s literacy.

Mendoza holds a BA from Notre Dame and is an alumnus of the Stanford Executive Program (SEP). In September 2000 Notre Dame named (was not named before) their business school the Mendoza College of Business after an endowment from Tom and Kathy Mendoza.

References

External links

Tom Mendoza Contributor Profile on Forbes.com
 Tom Mendoza: Toward a Culture of Respect
 
 
 Our History Mendoza College of Business University of Notre Dame
Wall Street Journal Interview with Tom Mendoza
Leadership in Technology
Foresight in Business and Society
Tom Mendoza Risk Takers
Tom Mendoza The Power of Corporate Culture
Why Tomorrow's Business Must Be A Great Place To Work
Tom Mendoza on Forbes – 6 Ways to Embrace Change
Tom Mendoza on Fox Business – How Technology and Data are changing Sports
Safari Books Tom Mendoza's Lessons on Public Speaking
Tom Mendoza on Businessweek – Climbing the Ladder

American chief executives
Businesspeople in information technology
Stanford Graduate School of Business alumni
University of Notre Dame alumni
American motivational speakers
Living people
1950 births